Málaga Airport  is an airport serving the town of Málaga, in the Santander Department of Colombia. The airport and town are halfway up a major north–south ridge in the eastern Colombian Andes. The runway is on the northern edge of the town.

See also

Transport in Colombia
List of airports in Colombia

References

External links
OpenStreetMap - Málaga
OurAirports - Málaga
FallingRain - Málaga

Airports in Colombia